Amblyseius indirae is a species of mite in the family Phytoseiidae.

References

indirae
Articles created by Qbugbot
Animals described in 1985